Kihara is a cosmopolitan town located in Kenya's Central Province. 
Kihara, written as "Kîhara is named its founding father.
Its close proximity to Nairobi city and UNEP makes it an idea place to live

References 

Populated places in Central Province (Kenya)